Dandampally is a village and Gram panchayat of Nalgonda mandal, Nalgonda district, in Telangana state (in India).

See also
Gram panchayats under Nalgonda mandal
India

References

Villages in Nalgonda district